Jean Lemierre (born 6 June 1950) is a French former public servant who was the president of the European Bank for Reconstruction and Development from 2000 to 2008. He is now chairman of BNP Paribas.

Career

Public sector 
In 2000, Lemierre was elected as the new chief of the European Bank for Reconstruction and Development (EBRD), succeeding Horst Köhler. During his time in office, he warned Russia to stop Yukos-style expropriations from spreading.

In 2004, the French government nominated Lemierre as candidate to head the International Monetary Fund (IMF); the post went to Rodrigo Rato instead. From 2005 until 2008, he served on the advisory board of the Commission on Legal Empowerment of the Poor.

Private sector
Following his departure from EBRD, Lemierre joined BNP Paribas as an adviser.
 
In 2011, Lemierre (alongside Charles Dallara) was co-head of the bondholders’ committee that renegotiated €200 billion of Greek bonds with the government in a high-stakes deal that staved off the country's collapse.

Lemierre was the bank's key negotiator in the record $8.9 billion fine it paid in 2014 for violating U.S. sanctions on Sudan, Libya and Cuba between 2002 and 2012. In 2014, he was appointed chairman of the board of directors.

Other activities

Government agencies 
 Monetary Authority of Singapore (MAS), Member of the International Advisory Panel

Corporate boards
 Türk Ekonomi Bankası (TBE), Member of the Board of Directors
 Total S.A., Independent Member of the Board of Directors
 China Investment Corporation (CIC), Member of the International Advisory Council
 China Development Bank (CDB), Member of the International Advisory Council

Non-profit organizations
 Centre d'Etudes Prospectives et d'Informations Internationales (CEPII), Chairman 
 European Financial Services Roundtable (EFR), Member
 French Association of Private Enterprises (AFEP), Member of the Board of Directors
 Institute of International Finance (IIF), Member of the Board
 Paris Europlace, Member of the Board of Directors
 Trilateral Commission, Member of the European Group

References

1950 births
Living people
French bankers
Sciences Po alumni
École nationale d'administration alumni
Inspection générale des finances (France)
BNP Paribas people
People from Seine-Maritime
TotalEnergies people
China Investment Corporation people
China Development Bank people
Officiers of the Légion d'honneur
Officers of the Ordre national du Mérite